Sinijanella is a genus of corynexochid trilobites that lived during the early part of the Botomian stageof the Cambrian Period.

References

Corynexochida genera
Dolichometopidae
Cambrian trilobites
Cambrian trilobites of Asia
Cambrian trilobites of Europe